Helios Gómez (1905 in Seville – 1956 in Barcelona) was a Spanish painter anarcho-communist activist and poet.

Bibliography
Helios Gómez, poemas de lucha y sueño, 1942–1956, ACHG, Barcelona, 2006
Helios Gómez, Visca Octubre, Museu de Granollers, ACHG, Museu d'Història de Catalunya, CarCob (Bruselas), Granollers, 2005
IVAM Centre Julio González: HELIOS GÓMEZ 1905–1956, Generalitat Valenciana, Valencia, 1998
Ursula Tjaden: Helios Gómez Artista de Corbata Roja, Txalaparta, Tafalla, 1996.
Carles Fontserè: Memòries d'un cartelista, Portic, Barcelona,1995.
Ursula Tjaden: Die Hülle zerfetzen Helios Gómez 1905–1956 Andalusier Künstler Kämpfer, Elefanten Press Verlag GmbH, Berlín, 1986.
Juan Manuel Bonet: Art Contra la Guerra, Ajuntament de Barcelona, Barcelona, 1986

External links
Helios Gómez
Helios Gómez Page from the Daily Bleed's Anarchist Encyclopedia

1905 births
1956 deaths
20th-century poets
Anarcho-communists
Romani artists
Romani poets
Spanish anarchists
Spanish artists
Spanish communists
Spanish revolutionaries
Spanish Romani people
Inmates of Presó Model de Barcelona